Christopher Patrick Lambert (born 6 April 1981 in Dulwich, London) is a former professional sprinter from England.

He grew up on Southampton Way Estate in Peckham, London, attending to school at Oliver Goldsmith's Primary School in Camberwell and Haberdashers' Aske's Hatcham College, before attending Harvard University, where he was a member of The Phoenix – S K Club.

As a junior athlete in 1999, Lambert finished 3rd at the European Junior Championships and ran the fastest time in the world over 200m for an U20 athlete.  Named captain of the Great British Junior team in 2000, he was unable to compete for the majority of the season due to a hamstring injury but left the age group ranked 3rd on the national all-time list.  At Harvard, Lambert broke 5 college and 3 Ivy League records (for the 60m, 100m and 200m), winning 6 Ivy League titles and finishing 4th in the 2003 NCAA Men's Outdoor Track and Field Championship, becoming an NCAA All-American.

On graduating and beginning a professional career, Lambert won gold in a championship record time at the 2003 European Athletics U23 Championships. He then became an Olympian, securing selection to TeamGB for the 2004 Olympic Games in Athens, but due to injury he surrendered his place on the 4x100m relay team that went on to win the gold medal.  He claimed a silver medal at the 2005 European Athletics Indoor Championships then in an injury-plagued career he was also selected for but had to withdraw from the 2002 European Athletics Championships, 2005 IAAF World Championships in Athletics and 2006 Commonwealth Games.

He finally retired in 2008 due to complications resulting from suffering several stress fractures to the right tibia.

Lambert remains a keen sports fan, focusing on athletics, football (lifelong Arsenal supporter), and golf.

International competitions

References
 
 

1981 births
Living people
Athletes from London
English male sprinters
British male sprinters
Olympic male sprinters
Olympic athletes of Great Britain
Athletes (track and field) at the 2004 Summer Olympics
Commonwealth Games competitors for England
Athletes (track and field) at the 2002 Commonwealth Games
Athletes (track and field) at the 2006 Commonwealth Games
Harvard Crimson men's track and field athletes
Universiade medalists in athletics (track and field)
Universiade gold medalists for Great Britain
Universiade bronze medalists for Great Britain
Medalists at the 2003 Summer Universiade
Medalists at the 2001 Summer Universiade